Dubki is an urban locality (an urban-type settlement) in Kazbekovsky District of the Republic of Dagestan, Russia. As of the 2010 Census, its population was 5,202.

Administrative and municipal status
Within the framework of administrative divisions, the urban-type settlement of Dubki is incorporated within Kazbekovsky District as Dubki Settlement (an administrative division of the district). As a municipal division, Dubki Settlement is incorporated within Kazbekovsky Municipal District as Dubki Urban Settlement.

References

Notes

Sources

Urban-type settlements in the Republic of Dagestan
